Bato-Munko Demyanovich Vankeyev (born 4 February 1977) is a boxer from Belarus.

Vankeev qualified for the 2004 Summer Olympics by ending up in first place at the 2nd AIBA European 2004 Olympic Qualifying Tournament in Warsaw, Poland. At the 2004 Summer Olympics he was stopped in the first round of the Flyweight (51 kg) division by Juan Carlos Payano of the Dominican Republic.

At the 2005 World Championships he edged out Enkhbatyn Badar-Uugan 29:27 in round 1 then lost to Tajikistani boxer Anvar Yunusov.

Two years later, Vankeev won a bronze medal in the same division at the 2006 European Amateur Boxing Championships in Plovdiv.

References

Buryat sportspeople
1977 births
Living people
Flyweight boxers
Boxers at the 2004 Summer Olympics
Olympic boxers of Belarus
Belarusian people of Buryat descent
People from Buryatia
Belarusian male boxers